The Witcher 3: Wild Hunt is a 2015 action role-playing game developed and published by CD Projekt. It is the sequel to the 2011 game The Witcher 2: Assassins of Kings and the third game in The Witcher video game series, played in an open world with a third-person perspective. The games follow The Witcher series of fantasy novels written by Andrzej Sapkowski. 

The game takes place in a fictional fantasy world based on Slavic mythology. Players control Geralt of Rivia, a monster slayer for hire known as a Witcher, and search for his adopted daughter, who is on the run from the otherworldly Wild Hunt. Players battle the game's many dangers with weapons and magic, interact with non-player characters, and complete quests to acquire experience points and gold, which are used to increase Geralt's abilities and purchase equipment. The game's story has three possible endings, determined by the player's choices at key points in the narrative.

Development began in 2011 and lasted for three and a half years. Central and Northern European cultures formed the basis of the game's world. The game was developed using the REDengine 3, which enabled CD Projekt to create a complex story without compromising its open world. The music was primarily composed by Marcin Przybyłowicz and performed by the Brandenburg State Orchestra.

The Witcher 3: Wild Hunt was released for PlayStation 4, Windows, and Xbox One in May 2015, with a Nintendo Switch version released in October 2019, and PlayStation 5 and Xbox Series X/S versions titled The Witcher 3: Wild Hunt - Complete Edition which was released in December 2022. The game received critical acclaim, with praise for its gameplay, narrative, world design, combat, and visuals, although it received minor criticism due to technical issues. It holds more than 200 game of the year awards and has been cited as one of the greatest video games ever made. Two expansions were also released to critical acclaim: Hearts of Stone and Blood and Wine. A Game of the Year edition was released in August 2016, with the base game, expansions and all downloadable content included. The game shipped over 40 million copies, making it one of the best-selling video games of all time.

Gameplay

The Witcher 3: Wild Hunt is an action role-playing game with a third-person perspective. Players control Geralt of Rivia, a monster slayer known as a Witcher. Geralt walks, runs, rolls and dodges, and (for the first time in the series) jumps, climbs and swims. He has a variety of weapons, including bombs, a crossbow and two swords (one steel and one silver). The steel sword is used primarily to kill humans while the silver sword is more effective against creatures and monsters. Players can draw out, switch and sheathe their swords at will. There are two modes of melee attack; light attacks are fast but weak, and heavy attacks are slow but strong. Players can block and counter enemy attacks with their swords. Swords have limited endurance and require regular repair. In addition to physical attacks, Geralt has five magical signs at his disposal: Aard, Axii, Igni, Yrden and Quen. Aard prompts Geralt to unleash a telekinetic blast, Axii confuses enemies, Igni burns them, Yrden slows them down and Quen offers players a temporary, protective shield. The signs use stamina, and cannot be used indefinitely. Players can use mutagens to increase Geralt's magic power. Geralt loses health when attacked by enemies, although wearing armour can help reduce health loss. Health is restored with meditation or consumables, such as food and potions. Players occasionally control Ciri, Geralt's adoptive daughter who can teleport short distances.

The game has responsive, advanced artificial intelligence (AI) and dynamic environments. The day-night cycle influences some monsters; a werewolf becomes powerful during the night of a full moon. Players can learn about their enemies and prepare for combat by reading the in-game bestiary. When they kill an enemy, they can loot its corpse for valuables. Geralt's witcher sense enables players to find objects of interest, including items that can be collected or scavenged. Items are stored in the inventory, which can be expanded by purchasing upgrades. Players can sell items to vendors or use them to craft potions and bombs. They can visit blacksmiths to craft new weapons and armorers to craft new armour with what they have gathered. The price of an item and the cost of crafting it depend on a region's local economy. Players earn experience points by completing quests. When a player earns enough experience, Geralt's level increases and the player receives ability points. These points may be used on four skill trees: combat, signs, alchemy and general. Combat upgrades enhance Geralt's attacks and unlock new fighting techniques; signs upgrades enable him to use magic more efficiently, and alchemy upgrades improve crafting abilities. General upgrades have a variety of functions, from raising Geralt's vitality to increasing crossbow damage.

The game focuses on narrative and has a dialogue tree which allows players to choose how to respond to non-player characters. Geralt must make decisions which change the state of the world and lead to 36 possible endings, affecting the lives of in-game characters. He can have a romantic relationship with some of the game's female characters by completing certain quests. In addition to the main quests, books offer more information on the game's world. Players can begin side quests after visiting a town's noticeboard. These side missions include Witcher Contracts (elaborate missions requiring players to hunt monsters) and Treasure Hunt quests, which reward players with top-tier weapons or armour. The game's open world is divided into several regions. Geralt can explore each region on foot or by transportation, such as a boat. Roach, his horse, may be summoned at will. Players can kill enemies with their sword while riding Roach, but an enemy presence may frighten the horse and unseat Geralt. Points of interest may be found on the map, and players receive experience points after completing mini-missions in these regions. Players can discover Places of Power for additional ability points. Other activities include horse racing, boxing and card playing; the card-playing mechanic was later expanded into a standalone game, Gwent: The Witcher Card Game.

Synopsis

Setting
The game is set in the Continent, a fictional fantasy world based on Slavonic mythology. It is surrounded by parallel dimensions and extra-dimensional worlds. Humans, elves, dwarves, monsters and other creatures co-exist on the Continent, but non-humans are often persecuted for their differences. The Continent is caught up in a war between the empire of Nilfgaard—led by Emperor Emhyr var Emreis (Charles Dance), who invaded the Northern Kingdoms—and Redania, ruled by King Radovid V. Several locations appear, including the free city of Novigrad, the Redanian city of Oxenfurt, the no man's land of Velen, the city of Vizima (former capital of the recently conquered Temeria), the Skellige islands (home to several Norse-Gaels Viking clans) and the witcher stronghold of Kaer Morhen.

The main character is the Witcher, Geralt of Rivia (Doug Cockle), a monster hunter trained since childhood in combat, tracking, alchemy and magic, and made stronger, faster and resistant to toxins by mutagens. He is aided by his lover, the powerful sorceress Yennefer of Vengerberg (Denise Gough), his former love interest Triss Merigold (Jaimi Barbakoff), the bard Dandelion (John Schwab), the dwarf warrior Zoltan Chivay (Alexander Morton), and Geralt's Witcher mentor Vesemir (William Roberts). Geralt is spurred into action by the reappearance of his and Yennefer's adopted daughter, Ciri (Jo Wyatt). Ciri is a Source, born with innate (and potentially vast) magical abilities; after the apparent death of her parents, she was trained as a witcher while Yennefer taught her magic. Ciri disappeared years before to escape the Wild Hunt, a group of spectral warriors led by the King of the Wild Hunt: the elf Eredin, from a parallel dimension.

Plot

Geralt and his mentor Vesemir arrive at the town of White Orchard after receiving a letter from Geralt's long-lost lover Yennefer. After defeating a griffin for the local Nilfgaardian garrison, Geralt accompanies Yennefer to the city of Vizima, where they meet with Emperor Emhyr. Emhyr orders Geralt to find Ciri, who is Emhyr's biological, and Geralt's adopted daughter. Ciri is a Child of the Elder Blood, the last heir to an ancient Elven bloodline that grants her the power to manipulate time and space, and is being relentlessly stalked by the enigmatic Wild Hunt. Geralt learns of three places Ciri was recently seen: the war-ravaged swamp province of Velen, the free city-state of Novigrad, and the Skellige Isles.

In Velen, Geralt tracks Ciri to the fortress of the Bloody Baron, a warlord who recently took over the province. The Baron demands that Geralt find his missing wife and daughter in exchange for information about Ciri. Geralt learns that the Baron drove his own family away with his drunken rages; while his daughter fled to Oxenfurt, his wife Anna became a servant of the Crones, three malicious witches that watch over Velen. He also discovers that Ciri was briefly captured by the Crones, but escaped to the Baron's stronghold before continuing on to Novigrad.

At Novigrad, Geralt reunites with his former lover Triss Merigold, who has gone underground to escape persecution by the Church of the Eternal Fire. He learns that Ciri and his old friend Dandelion ran afoul of Novigrad's powerful crime bosses while seeking to break a curse related to a mysterious phylactery. With the help of Triss and several old acquaintances, Geralt rescues Dandelion, who tells him that Ciri teleported to Skellige to escape pursuit by guards.

Geralt sails to Skellige and reunites with Yennefer, who is investigating a magical explosion near where Ciri was last seen. They discover that Ciri visited the island of Lofoten, but when the Wild Hunt attacked again, fled in a boat with an unidentified elf. When the boat returned to shore, its only occupant was Uma, a deformed creature Geralt previously saw living with the Bloody Baron. Deducing that Uma was the victim of the curse Ciri tried to lift in Novigrad, Geralt collects Uma in Velen and takes him to the nearly abandoned witcher school at Kaer Morhen. Working with Yennefer and his fellow witchers, Geralt breaks the curse and restores Uma's true identity: Avallac'h, Ciri's teacher and the elf seen with her on her travels. Avallac'h tells Geralt that he placed Ciri in an enchanted sleep on the Isle of Mists to keep her temporarily safe from the Wild Hunt.

Geralt finds Ciri on the Isle of Mists and learns from her that Eredin, the leader of the Wild Hunt, wants her Elder Blood powers to save his homeworld from a catastrophe known as the White Frost. They return to Kaer Morhen and fortify it against the inevitable arrival of the Hunt. In the battle that ensues, Vesemir is killed, causing Ciri to unleash her uncontrolled power and temporarily send the Hunt into retreat.

Realizing that the Hunt will never stop, Ciri and Geralt decide to fight Eredin at a time and place of their choosing. While Triss and Yennefer reform the Lodge of Sorceresses to aid in the fight, Geralt recovers the Sunstone, an artifact that can communicate between worlds. Using the Sunstone, Avallac'h lures Eredin to Skellige, where Geralt defeats him in combat. As he dies, Eredin tells Geralt that Avallac'h has betrayed him, and plans to use Ciri's power for his own ends.

As the White Frost begins to encroach on the Continent, Geralt and Yennefer pursue Avallac'h, but find Ciri alive and well. She tells Geralt that Avallac'h is not a traitor, and has only ever intended to fight the White Frost. Thinking back on her relationship with Geralt, Ciri finds the strength to stop the cataclysm; if Geralt patronized and protected her throughout the game, she dies in the attempt, but if he guided her to mature and make her own choices, she survives.

The player's choices can lead to several different endings. If Ciri survives after defeating the White Frost and Geralt took her to meet her father, she will become the Empress of Nilfgaard. If Ciri survives but did not meet the emperor, Geralt helps her fake her death, and she becomes a witcher. If Ciri is killed in her confrontation with the White Frost, the story ends with Geralt retrieving her medallion from the last remaining Crone. The player's choices also determine whether Geralt ends up in a romantic relationship with Yennefer, Triss, or neither, and how much of the North is ultimately conquered by Nilfgaard.

Development
Although the game was planned to begin production in 2008, CD Projekt Red's preoccupation with Rise of the White Wolf pushed it back to 2011. The company developed The Witcher 3: Wild Hunt with a self-funded budget of US$81 million over three-and-a-half years. The project began with 150 employees, eventually growing to over 250 in-house staff. 1,500 people were involved in the production globally. While the game is based on Andrzej Sapkowski's novels, it is not an official continuation of them and Sapkowski's involvement with the game was limited to the creation of its in-game map. The game was localised in 15 languages, with a total of 500 voice actors. The game was scripted concurrently in Polish and English to alleviate difficulty in localisation. According to Side (the company which handled voice casting and recording), the 450,000-word script had 950 speaking roles. The voices were recorded from late 2012 to early 2015. CD Projekt Red wanted the game to be free of any digital rights management (DRM) due to the developer's unsuccessful control of piracy with its predecessor, The Witcher 2: Assassins of Kings, whose DRM also made it run slowly.

The Witcher 3: Wild Hunt was created with the REDengine 3, CD Projekt Red's proprietary game engine designed for nonlinear role-playing video games set in open world environments, aided by the PlayStation 4 and Xbox One consoles and prepared for use in October 2014. The first play-through indicated to the developers that the open world, despite its content and generation around the quests, seemed empty. As a solution, they added points of interest. The game had 5,000 bugs that December, which (with a launch date of February 2015) necessitated its postponement. Like the previous two Witcher games, players are given a complex story with multiple choices and consequences. Unlike other game engines, REDengine 3 permits a complex storyline without sacrificing virtual world design. The user interface was made more intuitive with grid-based solutions. The camera system was improved to use long shots for battles with multiple enemies and close-ups for more-intimate confrontations. More animations were used for combat sequences than in The Witcher 2, with each lasting less than one second for quick succession. Game director Konrad Tomaszkiewicz and senior game designer Damien Monnier cited Dark Souls and Demon's Souls as influences on Wild Hunt combat system, and level designer Miles Tost and senior environment artist Jonas Mattsson cited The Legend of Zelda series and Red Dead Redemption as influencing the game's level designs and environments.

Months before its release date, the game's economy, crafting, and inventory systems were incomplete and apparently unable to meet the deadline. Senior gameplay designer Matthew Steinke thought of a remedy and drew up a system context diagram. To allocate prices, Steinke wrote a formula based on rate of damage, defence, or healing. Polynomial least squares were used to determine its efficacy, and it was found to eliminate bugs from the system and reduce loading times. Each character was given a unique personality to contrast the fetch-quest system typically used in video games. It was decided early that the writing would be witty, with metaphors and implied meanings. The dialogue was limited to 15 lines, with occasional exceptions, to retain content originality. Player options were written as morally ambiguous, reflecting real life and Andrzej Sapkowski's original Witcher series. Alcoholism, abuse and sexuality, depicted as normal parts of the medieval world, were incorporated into the story for authenticity. Areas of the open world were based on Poland, Amsterdam, and Scandinavia. Objects were modelled by hand.

Storylines such as Yennefer imprisoning Geralt on an island and Geralt's covert recruitment to the Wild Hunt were discarded to make the game smaller and avoid splitting it into two parts. The card game Gwent was preceded by other mini-game proposals, including a drinking game, knife throwing, and ice skating. A re-enactment of the Battle of Grunwald was recorded for the sounds of battle, marching, blacksmithing, and the firing of arrows. Recording the knights' voices for post-processing, the speakers wore helmets for an authentic sound. Marcin Przybyłowicz was the game's music director and composer, with additional music contributed by Polish folk band Percival. According to Przybyłowicz, working with Percival was a challenge; he expected an academic approach before learning that most of the group were not formally trained, and much of the music was improvised. Multi-instrumentalist Robert Jaworski of the folk band Żywiołak recorded lute, Renaissance fiddle, bowed gusle, and hurdy-gurdy sections. The score was performed in Frankfurt an der Oder by the Brandenburg State Orchestra, conducted by Bernd Ruf.

Release
The Witcher 3: Wild Hunt was announced in 2013, then to be released for PC, PlayStation 4, and Xbox One the following year. The release date was later delayed from the third quarter of 2014 to February 2015. After missing its planned release date of 24 February, CD Projekt Red confirmed in April that the game was released to manufacturing. The Witcher 3: Wild Hunt was released worldwide on 19 May 2015. Polish Prime Minister Ewa Kopacz and President Bronisław Komorowski visited CD Projekt Red to celebrate the launch. As with the second game, Warner Bros. Interactive Entertainment and Bandai Namco Entertainment each handled physical distribution of the game in North America and Western Europe, Australia and New Zealand respectively. In addition to the standard edition, players can also purchase the Collector's Edition, which includes the base game and items such as an artbook, a statue of Geralt fighting against a griffin, and a Witcher medallion. At E3 2019, a port for the Nintendo Switch, The Witcher 3: Wild Hunt – Complete Edition, was announced. It was developed in cooperation with Saber Interactive, and was released on 15 October 2019. The port features slight graphical downgrades to compensate for the Switch's less powerful hardware, but is otherwise identical to existing versions.

CD Projekt Red co-founder Marcin Iwiński listed three pillars that he considered integral to marketing: game quality, a "gamer-centric value proposition", and communication with fans. To achieve the second, The Witcher 3: Wild Hunt was marketed as "Skyrim in a Game of Thrones sauce". The third explained in detail the visual downgrade from earlier promotional footage to the finished product, which Iwiński thought effective. The logo was re-designed to make it less obvious that The Witcher 3: Wild Hunt was a sequel; the number three suggested a claw mark or mask to an audience unfamiliar with the series, while fans would recognise it as the mark of the Wild Hunt.

Downloadable content
The developer studied Witcher forums and websites such as Reddit to predict what players generally desired from downloadable content (DLC). A collection of 16 free DLC was released, as announced before release by the developers. They included cosmetic and additional gameplay content and the New Game Plus mode. CD Projekt Red announced two expansion packs: Hearts of Stone and Blood and Wine. Hearts of Stone was released on 13 October 2015, and Blood and Wine on 31 May 2016. Hearts of Stone follows Geralt as he contacts a mysterious entity known as the Man of Glass and an immortal man, Olgierd von Everec. The expansion was critically acclaimed. The second expansion pack, Blood and Wine, follows Geralt as he travels to Toussaint (a Nilfgaardian duchy untouched by war) to track down a mysterious beast which is terrorizing the region. It was also critically acclaimed, winning the Best RPG category at The Game Awards 2016. A Game of the Year edition, with the base game, both expansions and all DLC, was released on 30 August 2016.

Re-release
In December of 2022, the publisher re-released the game for the PlayStation 5, Windows, and Xbox Series X/S. The re-released game became available as a free upgrade for existing owners on PlayStation 4, Windows, and Xbox One, but also could be purchased separately. The re-release has been lauded for numerous visual enhancements made to the game.

In 2021, video game news site Kotaku had reported that the re-release would include content from mods produced by fans; "HalkHogan", creator of a mod that improves the game's textures, announced that the developer had entered talks to include content from "The Witcher 3 HD Reworked Project" in the release. CD Projekt Red confirmed to Kotaku that they had entered talks with mod creators, prompting discussion about why the company, which earned $300mil in 2020, sought out community assistance.

The re-release was originally scheduled for the second half of 2021, but was delayed to the second quarter of 2022. The re-released game was originally being developed by Saber Interactive. On 13 April 2022, CDPR announced that its in-house development team would be taking over the remaining work on the re-release, and that its release date would be postponed. In November, a release date of 14 December 2022 was announced.

The next-gen update included new outfits and a quest inspired by the Netflix-Series, improved visuals and performance and bug fixes as well as all previously released downloadable content. The re-release was published on schedule, but was criticized for introducing performance issues and bugs. Later that day, CD Projekt Red announced that they were investigating the issues and working on fixes.

Reception

Critical reception

The Witcher 3: Wild Hunt received "universal acclaim" for the PC, PlayStation 4, PlayStation 5, Xbox One, and Xbox Series X/S versions, and "generally favorable reviews" for the Switch version, according to review aggregator Metacritic. Critics agreed that it was an ambitious action role-playing game which was grand in scale, but marred by technical difficulties and a lack of innovation. GameSpot and Eurogamer gave the game their highest rating. The Witcher 3: Wild Hunt has been considered one of the greatest games of all time.

The game world received widespread praise from critics. Kimberly Wallace of Game Informer called it "immersive", and was impressed by its attention to detail. Destructoids Chris Carter praised its size, which he found enormous and would take players hours to explore. Jonathon Leack, writing for Game Revolution, praised the game's effective use of its large world. Leack wrote that every region had quests and activities for players to try, although he thought that much was filler which extended its length. Tom Senior of GamesRadar praised the open world's variety, describing it as an "exciting realization of the Ronin fantasy". GameTrailers Daniel Bloodworth praised the game for encouraging exploration; many quests would only become available to players after they met non-playable characters in different parts of the world. Vince Ingenito of IGN and Shaun Prescott of PC Gamer were impressed by the game's scenery and its day-night cycle, with Ingenito saying that it highlighted the game world's authenticity.

Its narrative received critical acclaim. Carter praised the cast of characters, which he called unique and interesting. He considered the narrative more involving, with players witnessing key events and making consequential choices. Wallace praised the game's dialogue and its side-quests; each was similar to a short story, and player decisions in the quests would influence the state of the world. She liked the main quest, which added more character to Geralt, and said that the romance options were a significant improvement over its predecessors. However, she was disappointed with the quality of the game's endings. Kevin Van Ord of GameSpot echoed Wallace, noting that The Witcher 3: Wild Hunts story had more characterisation for Geralt than the previous games. He welcomed the change, since it gave players emotional connections to the in-game characters. Senior enjoyed the side-quests, calling them "a compilation of dark fantasy short stories" which overshadowed the main quests. Ingenito was disappointed with the main story, saying that there was too much padding and too many dull quests. PC Gamers Shaun Prescott agreed, saying that the narrative would have felt rote if the side content was not engaging. Van Ord, Wallace and Brett Phipps of VideoGamer.com praised the voice acting, with Wallace calling it the series' best. Arthur Gies from Polygon criticized that some of the female characters are overly sexualized and that there are no people of color in the main game.

The game's combat had a generally-positive reception. Bloodworth found Geralt more mobile and agile with the new climbing and swimming mechanic. Carter said that it was significantly streamlined and its predecessors' strategic elements removed, but appreciated its action. Wallace wrote that with a simplified alchemy system, a decent user interface and diverse difficulty settings the combat was more accessible, although she disliked the disruptive weapon-degradation system and unrefined crossbow shooting mechanic. Leack thought the system lacked complexity and criticised its lack of polish, caused by the unreliable lock-on system, camera issues and excessively-long combat animation. Senior noted that some gameplay mechanics, such as rolling and dodging, were inconsistent and made the system feel unfair. Ingenito praised the combat, describing its fluidity as a significant improvement over its predecessors.

Other gameplay aspects received mixed reviews. Van Ord praised the game's customisation and upgrade system (which offered players a sense of progression), since it hardened as the story unfolded. Ingenito called its upgrade system deep and flexible, since players have considerable freedom when customising Geralt's skills. Leack disliked the upgrade system, calling it "unexciting". Carter was disappointed with the Witcher Senses, finding it repetitive, but Senior considered them superior to objective markers—the norm for role-playing games. Prescott disliked the user interface for its clumsiness and tedium. Senior found the Gwent card game an addictive minigame.

The game was criticised for its technical issues. Carter called its climbing animations stiff, noting that some gameplay bugs would hinder player progress. According to Wallace, the game's load times were too long. Leack noted that the game had a graphic downgrade, and the actual game did not look as good as the 2013 demonstration. Senior, Phipps and Ingenito noted frame rate issues; although Ingenito thought it did not impact the gameplay, Phipps called it a persistent problem which overshadowed many of the game's achievements.

Sales
Before its release, over 1.5 million people pre-ordered the game. The Witcher 3: Wild Hunt debuted atop the UK software sales chart in its first week, when it earned 600 percent more than predecessor The Witcher 2: Assassins of Kings. It was the best-selling video game of the year in the UK, breaking the record held by Battlefield Hardline. It debuted atop the Japanese video-game sales charts, selling 67,385 copies in its first week. Four million copies of the game were sold in its first two weeks of release.

By June 2015, over 690,000 players had activated the game through GOG Galaxy. The game sold over six million copies in the next six weeks, and the studio made a profit of $63.3 million in the first half of 2015. In March 2016, CD Projekt Red reported that the game had shipped nearly 10 million copies worldwide. By the end of 2017, the series as a whole had sold over 33 million. By June 2019, that number had risen to over 40 million, with The Witcher 3: Wild Hunt accounting for over half of that figure.

Following the release of the first season of Netflix' television series The Witcher in December 2019, The Witcher 3: Wild Hunt had a 554% increase in sales that month compared to December 2018. By December 2019, The Witcher 3: Wild Hunt had sold over 28 million copies worldwide. And by April 2021 it had sold over 30 million copies, while the series as a whole had sold over 50 million. By April 2022, the game had sold 40 million copies.

Awards

The Witcher 3: Wild Hunt received pre-release awards at E3 in 2013 and 2014. It was voted the best role-playing game at the IGN Best of E3 Awards in 2013 and 2014. It won IGN's E3 People's Choice Award in 2013 and 2014, GameSpot's E3 People's Choice Award in 2014, and the Most Wanted Award at the 31st and 32nd Golden Joystick Awards. It was the Most Anticipated Game at the Game Awards 2014 in Las Vegas. It received 260 game of the year awards and was the most awarded game of all time until 2021, when it was overtaken by The Last of Us Part II. By August 2016, it had received over 800 awards. On 2020, Gamesradar listed it as the top game of the generation.

Its accolades are from several events, including the Golden Joystick Awards, The Game Awards, D.I.C.E. Awards, Game Developers Choice Awards, SXSW Gaming Awards and the National Academy of Video Game Trade Reviewers (NAVGTR) awards. The Witcher 3 was recognized as game of the year by IGN, GameSpot, Game Informer and other gaming publications. The game received a Golden Joystick Award for Best Storytelling, Best Visual Design and Best Gaming Moment, and the Game Awards for Best Role-Playing Game and Studio of the Year for CD Projekt Red. It won Outstanding Achievement in Game Design, Outstanding Technical Achievement and Outstanding Achievement in Story at the D.I.C.E. Awards, and won the Game of the Year and Best Technology awards at the 16th Annual Game Developers Choice Awards.

Notes

References

External links

 
 Witcher 3 guide page
 

2015 video games
Action role-playing video games
Bandai Namco games
CD Projekt games
Censored video games
Fantasy video games
Game Developers Choice Award for Game of the Year winners
Golden Joystick Award for Game of the Year winners
Nintendo Switch games
Open-world video games
PlayStation 4 games
PlayStation 4 Pro enhanced games
PlayStation 5 games
The Game Award for Game of the Year winners
3 Wild Hunt
Video game sequels
Video games developed in Poland
Video games featuring female protagonists
Video games using PhysX
Video games scored by Marcin Przybyłowicz
Video games with alternate endings
Video games with downloadable content
Video games with expansion packs
Video games with stereoscopic 3D graphics
Warner Bros. video games
Windows games
Xbox One games
Xbox One X enhanced games
Xbox Series X and Series S games